The 2017 D1 Grand Prix series was the seventeenth season for the D1 Grand Prix series. The season began on April 1 at Odaiba Tokyo Street Course and ended on October 8 at the same course, with Hideyuki Fujino winning the D1GP Championship. The D1 Street Legal series did not run this year, and was replaced by the 2018 season with the D1 Lights series.

Teams and drivers

D1GP

Schedule

Drivers' rankings

D1GP

References

External links
  

D1 Grand Prix seasons
D1 Grand Prix